James Michael Cofer (born February 19, 1964) is a former professional American football player who attended Charlotte Country Day School. A 6'2",  placekicker from North Carolina State University, Cofer kicked in the National Football League for eight seasons from 1987–1993 and 1995. In the 1990s and 2002, he was also a stock car racing driver in the NASCAR Featherlite Southwest Tour and NASCAR Craftsman Truck Series.

Professional career
Cofer was the kicker for the San Francisco 49ers when they won back-to-back Super Bowls — Super Bowl XXIII and Super Bowl XXIV.

Cofer had a strong leg but was inconsistent for the 49ers in the late 1980s.  Fans lost faith in him early in the 1990s as he missed several short field goals, the lowest point being in 1991 where he made just 14 of 28 attempts. Cofer eventually ended his career with the Indianapolis Colts in 1995.

Racing career
In 1993, Cofer began racing in the NASCAR Featherlite Southwest Tour, running a race at Sears Point Raceway and finishing 39th after an oil pump failed. The following year, he began racing full-time in the series for JMC Enterprises, driving the No. 79 Chevrolet. Four races into the season, he won his first career race from the pole position at Stockton 99 Speedway, leading all 100 laps. He won two more poles at Saugus Speedway and Tucson Raceway Park, finishing fifth in the final points standings and winning the series' Rookie of the Year Award.

In 1995, he was offered an invitation to compete in the newly formed SuperTruck Series presented by Craftsman, but turned it down to take the job as kickers coach with the Carolina Panthers. In 2002, Cofer ran three races in the Truck Series starting at Indianapolis Raceway Park, driving the No. 04 Ford F-150 for Quality Motorsports and finishing 33rd after his radiator failed. He ran another for the team at Phoenix International Raceway, starting 30th and finishing 21st, his best runs of the season. Cofer later joined Ware Racing Enterprises for the season-ending race at Homestead-Miami Speedway, driving the No. 5 Dodge Ram. After starting last, he finished 26th, the last car running.

Motorsports career results

NASCAR
(key) (Bold – Pole position awarded by qualifying time. Italics – Pole position earned by points standings or practice time. * – Most laps led.)

Craftsman Truck Series

References

External links
 

Living people
1964 births
American football placekickers
Sportspeople from Columbia, South Carolina
Players of American football from Columbia, South Carolina
San Francisco 49ers players
Charlotte Country Day School alumni
New Orleans Saints players
Indianapolis Colts players
NC State Wolfpack football players
Racing drivers from South Carolina
NASCAR drivers
National Football League replacement players